The pale martin or pale sand martin (Riparia diluta) is a small passerine bird in the swallow family.

It is found in open habitats such as farmland, grassland and savannah, usually near water. It is found from Central Asia to southeastern China. The species was formerly considered a subspecies of the sand martin.

References

Rasmussen, P.C., and J.C. Anderton. 2005. Birds of South Asia. The Ripley guide. Volume 2: attributes and status. Smithsonian Institution and Lynx Edicions, Washington D.C. and Barcelona.

pale martin
Birds of Afghanistan
Birds of China
Birds of Central Asia
Birds of Mongolia
Birds of Pakistan
pale martin